Archinus was an Athenian democratic politician who wielded substantial influence between the restoration of democracy in 403 BC and the beginning of the Corinthian War in 395 BC.

In the early days of the restored democracy, he acted to weaken the oligarchic exiles at Eleusis by ending the period during which citizens could register to emigrate to Eleusis before its announced ending date.  He seems to have advocated a moderate democratic policy, opposing motions to expand the franchise and restore the levels of pay for civil service that had typified the golden days of Periclean democracy in Athens in the mid-5th century BC.

Archinus is also said to have encouraged the official adoption by Athens of the 24-letter Ionic alphabet in 403–2 (Suda), alongside the archon Eucleides.

References 

Buck, Robert J. Thrasybulus and the Athenian Democracy: The Life of an Athenian Statesman. Franz Steiner Verlag, 1998. 
Fine, John V. A. The Ancient Greeks: A critical history. Harvard University Press, 1983. 
D’ Angour, A.J. "Archinus, Eucleides and the reform of the Athenian alphabet". Bulletin of the Institute of Classical Studies 43 (1999) 109-130

5th-century BC Athenians
4th-century BC Athenians